Kënga Magjike 2007, was the ninth edition of the annual Albanian song competition, first held in 1999. It took place in the Palace of Congresses in Tirana, Albania. There were two semifinals (23 and 24 November 2007) and a final (25 November 2007). Fifty-four songs were heard in advance by the public at home, which narrowed them down to 40 songs by televoting. These songs competed in the semi-finals but only eighteen made it to the final. Ten songs were voted into the finals by the singers and eight songs by the jury. In the end, Aurela Gaçe won the first prize. Florjan Mumajesi and Soni Malaj were the runners-up. The winner was determined by the singers who voted for each other.

Results

Semifinal one

Semifinal two

Not in the semifinals

Voting procedure
Ten songs were voted into the finals by the singers and eight songs by the jury.
 The singers voted for each other to determine the ranking of the songs.
 The jury determined most of the other prizes, while the televote decided the "Public's Prize", the "Internet Prize" and the "Hit Song" prize.
 The production studios decided the "Discography Prize".
 Ardit Gjebrea decided the "Jon Music" prize.

Jury
 President of the Jury, Singer: Gaqo Çako
 President of the Jury, Singer: Luiza Papa
 Songwriter: Françesk Radi
 News Anchor: Tefta Radi
 Composer, Professor: Nora Çashku
 Filmmaker: Kujtim Çashku
 Singer: Kaliopi
 Actor, Filmmaker: Vasil Zafircev
 Singer: Mihrije Braha
 Singer: Naim Abazi
 Riza Cerova
 Diana Cerova

Other prizes

Orchestra
In all the live shows the singers used playback all the time. This has now become a tradition of the festival for years.

Guest artists

Comedians 

 Hajrie Rondo (Tana - 14 Vjeç Dhëndër)
 Albert Vërria (Xha Sulo - Kapedani)

Gaqo Çako Reprise
 Gaqo Çako
 Ema Qazimi
 Liljana Kondakçi
 Myfarete Laze
 Edit Mihali
 Limoz Dizdari
 Luiza Papa
 Ibrahim Madhi (violin)

Others
 Kaliopi
 Mihrije Braha
 Naim Abazi

Staff
 Executive Producer: Anila Gjebrea
 Stage: Bashkim Zahaj
 Organizer: Ardit Gjebrea
 Directors: Agron Vulaj; Astrit Idrizi

External links
 Competetion website
 Ardit Gjebrea information 

2007
2007 in Albania